"Evolution" is a song by American nu metal band Korn. The song was the first single to be released from the band's untitled album on June 12, 2007. It is one of the four tracks in which Brooks Wackerman of Bad Religion performed drumming duties.

Promotion

Music video
"Evolution", directed by Dave Meyers, was filmed on June 15, 2007 in Los Angeles. The music video features Slipknot drummer Joey Jordison, although the actual drum tracks were recorded by Brooks Wackerman. According to the casting call sheet, "Evolution" is "filled with political satire and humor." The production team sought mostly male actors to fill roles such as "hero scientists", religious politicians, doctors, green peace guys, anthropologists, military men, and "government types". Casting interviews were held June 12 and 13, 2007. Animation was done by Oddbot Animation.

Viral marketing
The domain www.evolutiondevolution.com was set up in promotion of the song. The website is a spoof to promote the "Evolution" music video. It is themed as a documentary publication website and features Korn acting as "experts" who studied evolution in support of a fake documentary titled Devolution: Nature's U-Turn. Vocalist Jonathan Davis explained that the band wanted to try a different kind of promotion, and so created the website and several viral promotion trailers.

Theme controversy
In response to the fake trailer for Devolution: Nature's U-Turn, Devo member Gerald Casale wrote on www.clubdevo.com: "We denounce this as imposters [sic] playing with fire." According to Casale, fans of Korn thereafter sent him hate mail. Casale then explained that he would have appreciated if Korn had recognized Devo as pioneers of the concept. Korn vocalist Jonathan Davis responded, "Korn never claimed to be the first to expose De-Evolution, our hats are off to Devo for that."

Song debut
"Evolution" debuted on May 16, 2007 via Los Angeles radio station KROQ and the Korn Myspace page. During the song's debut, bassist Reginald Arvizu and guitarist James Shaffer were present in the radio station's studio. The song premiered live on May 20, 2007 at the KROQ-FM Weenie Roast y Fiesta in Irvine, California.

Track listing
UK CD single
 "Evolution" – 3:39
 "Evolution (Dave Audé Remix)" – 3:41

Digital download
 "Evolution (Explicit/Clean)" – 3:38

UK 7" vinyl
 "Evolution" – 3:37
 "I Will Protect You" – 5:29

US promo maxi-single
"Evolution (Harry Choo Choo's Evolution Remix)" – 8:53
"Evolution (Dave Aude Remix)" – 7:42
"Evolution (Dave Aude Club Dub)" – 7:25
"Evolution (Dave Aude Radio)" – 3:42
"Evolution (David Garcia + Margan Page Remix)" – 6:39
"Evolution (David Garcia + Margan Page Dub)" – 6:36

EU CD radio promo
 "Evolution (Reverse Clean)"  – 3:37
 "Evolution (Super Clean)"  – 3:38
 "Evolution" – 3:39

UK promo CD
"Evolution" (Radio Edit)

Chart performance
"Evolution" became Korn's fourth single to reach the top five on Billboard's Mainstream Rock Songs chart. It also peaked in the top twenty on Alternative Songs chart.

Charts

See also

References

2007 singles
Korn songs
Music videos directed by Dave Meyers (director)
Song recordings produced by Atticus Ross
Song recordings produced by the Matrix (production team)
2007 songs
EMI Records singles
Songs written by Reginald Arvizu
Songs written by Lauren Christy
Songs written by Jonathan Davis
Songs written by Graham Edwards (musician)
Songs written by James Shaffer
Songs written by Scott Spock